Antoine Racine (January 26, 1822 – July 17, 1893) was a Canadian Roman Catholic priest and the 1st Bishop of Sherbrooke from 1874 to 1893.  He is buried in the Cathedral in Sherbrooke.

Séminaire Saint-Charles-Borromée (known as St. Charles Seminary in English) was founded by Racine in 1875, the year after he became the first Bishop of Sherbrooke. A degree-granting institution, perhaps its most famous alumnus was Prime Minister of Canada Louis St. Laurent, who graduated in 1902.

He is the namesake of Saint-Antoine-de-Padoue parish, also known as St-Antoine-de-Lennoxville.

References

External links

 
 

1822 births
1893 deaths
19th-century Roman Catholic bishops in Canada
Burials in Quebec
Roman Catholic bishops of Sherbrooke